Lope de Vega Theatre or Theater (American English), Spanish Teatro Lope de Vega may refer to:
Lope de Vega Theatre (Madrid), a theater in Madrid, Spain
Lope de Vega Theatre (Seville), a theater in Seville, Spain
Lope de Vega Theatre (Valladolid), a theater in Vallodolid, Spain